Gaja Prestor (born 22 April 2000) is a Slovenian singer.

Career
Prestor's first TV appearance was in 2016 when she entered Slovenija ima talent, the Slovenian version of Got Talent. At the auditions she sang a rendition of "I Dreamed a Dream" but ultimately failed to advance to the live shows. Prestor's debut single "To je kar imam" was released on 18 March 2018 through Menart Records. Prestor wrote the song together with Žan Serčič and since its release the song has accumulated nearly 250,000 views. Prestor successfully continued collaborating with Serčič, with whom she wrote her following single "Ona". She was also featured on "Nazaj" by Žan Serčič. On 9 December 2018 she released her third single "Decembra". Through 2019, Pestor released two more standalone singles, "Najino nebo" and "Le tebe rabim", respectively.

On 20 December 2019, Prestor was announced as one of the 12 participants in EMA 2020, the national contest in Slovenia to select the country's Eurovision Song Contest 2020 entry, with the song "Verjamem vase".

Discography

Singles
"Sledi" (2022)
"Zame" (2021)
"Verjamem vase" (2020)
"Le tebe rabim" (2019)
"Najino nebo" (2019)
"To je kar imam" (2018)
"Ona" (2018)
"Decembra" (2018)

Awards and nominations

References

2000 births
21st-century Slovenian women singers
Living people
Slovenian pop singers
Musicians from Celje